Elachista elegans is a moth of the family Elachistidae. It is found from Fennoscandia to Italy, Hungary and the Crimea and from Germany to Russia.

Adults are on wing from July to August in one or two generations per year.

The larvae feed on Bromus, Calamagrostis arundinacea, Calamagrostis epigejos, Dactylis, Milium effusum and Poa species. They mine the leaves of their host plant. The mine consists of a long, lower surface corridor, ascending from the base of the leaf, sometimes descending just before reaching the tip. The mine gradually widens, until most of the width of the leaf is occupied. The frass is mostly deposited along the side. Larvae can found in spring. They are yellowish green with a yellowish brown head.

References

elegans
Moths described in 1859
Moths of Europe